Olivier Ker Ourio (born 1964 in Paris, from a family originally from Réunion) is a jazz musician of Breton ancestry known for playing Chromatic harmonica. He has worked with Bruce Arnold, Franck Amsallem, David Kikoski, and Annie Ebrel among others. He has also shown an interest in Reunion Creole music and Celtic music.

References

Musicians from Réunion
Jazz harmonica players
1964 births
Living people